The 2021 Rugby Europe Women's Sevens Trophy was held in Zagreb, Croatia and in Budapest, Hungary. The first leg of the tournament was in Zagreb and the second leg was in Budapest.

Schedule

Standings

Zagreb 

All times in Central European Time (UTC+01:00). The Czech Republic won the first leg.

Pool stages

Pool A

Pool B

Knockout stages

5th place

Cup

Budapest 
All times in Central European Time (UTC+01:00)

Pool stages

Pool A

Pool B

Knockout stages

5th place

Cup

External links
Tournament page

References 

2021
2021 rugby sevens competitions